Redbank Railway Workshops are a major workshops for the repair and heavy maintenance of locomotives and rolling stock for Aurizon, located in Redbank, City of Ipswich, Queensland, Australia.

History

With its North Ipswich Railway Workshops becoming increasingly cramped, in July 1958 Queensland Railways opened a new workshop facility in Redbank to maintain its new diesel locomotive fleet. However it would be 25 years before all the functions were transferred from Ipswich.

The works perform heavy maintenance on Aurizon's locomotive and wagon fleet. It also has a contract to maintain rolling stock for Queensland Rail.

In May 2014, Aurizon announced that it would cease maintaining Queensland Rail rolling stock at Redbank from June 2015, with the entire works to close by June 2017. In November 2014, the site was sold to the Goodman Group who will lease it back to Aurizon.

In 2016, as part of a contract to outsource Aurizon's rolling stock maintenance to Progress Rail Services, it was announced that the workshops would remain open.

Queensland Rail no longer maintain their Citytrain fleet there having relocated to North Ipswich Railway Workshops recently ( In late 2018 ).

Locomotive Museum
In February 1970 the Redbank Locomotive Museum opened as an open air museum with 13 members of the Queensland Rail Heritage Fleet (2, 6, 48, 106, 221A, 290, 444, 700, 771, 1000, 1009, 1051 and 1089) on display. It closed in 1992 with the locomotives transferred to the North Ipswich Railway Workshops.

See also

Rail transport in Queensland

References

Aurizon
Ipswich, Queensland
Railway workshops in Australia
Redbank, Queensland
1958 establishments in Australia